Before the creation of the office of prime minister in 1876, Sweden did not have a head of government distinct from its head of state, the monarch, who traditionally held all executive authority. Louis De Geer, the architect of the bicameral Riksdag of 1866, which replaced the centuries-old Riksdag of the Estates, became Sweden's first prime minister in 1876. , the prime minister of Sweden is Ulf Kristersson, leader of the Moderate Party. The list below contains statistics about the tenures of each of the prime ministers of Sweden since 1876.

List of prime ministers 
Before 1876, when the office of prime minister was created, Sweden did not have a head of government separate from the monarch. The most-senior member of the Privy Council during the period of absolute rule was the lord high chancellor, whose role was similar to that of a head of government. That was most evident during the so-called Age of Liberty, from 1718 to 1772, when the monarch's powers were greatly reduced and the president of the Privy Council became the dominant political figure in Sweden.

Timeline

See also
Prime Minister of Sweden
Deputy Prime Minister of Sweden
Swedish governmental line of succession
Elections in Sweden
List of cabinets of Sweden
List of Swedish politicians
List of Spouses of the Prime Ministers of Sweden

Notes

 
Sweden
Prime Ministers